Scott K. Saiki (born July 17, 1964) is an American attorney and politician. Since 1994, he has served as a Democratic member of the Hawaii House of Representatives, representing the state's 26th district. He served as majority leader from 2013 to 2017. On May 4, 2017, he became speaker of the Hawaii House of Representatives.

Electoral history

2014

2016
In the 2016 election, Saiki ran unopposed in both the Democratic primary and general election.

2018
In the 2018 election, Saiki once again ran unopposed in both the Democratic primary and general election.

2020
In the 2020 election, Saiki faced LGBTQ activist and progressive candidate Kim Coco Iwamoto for the Democratic nomination. Saiki narrowly beat Iwamoto for the Democratic nomination and ran unopposed in the general election.

2022
In the 2022 Democratic Primary Saiki once again faced Kim Coco Iwamoto for the nomination. Due to redistricting Saiki was placed in the 25th District which contain Ala Moana and Kakaako. Saiki narrowly won with 51% of the vote he will face Rob Novak in the general election.

References

External links
Hawaii House of Representatives - Scott Saiki official government website
Project Vote Smart - Representative Scott K. Saiki (HI) profile
Follow the Money - Scott Saiki
2006 2004 2002 2000 1998 campaign contributions

1964 births
21st-century American politicians
Hawaii politicians of Japanese descent
Living people
Speakers of the Hawaii House of Representatives
Democratic Party members of the Hawaii House of Representatives